National Secondary Route 203, or just Route 203 (or ) is a National Road Route of Costa Rica, located in the San José province.

Description
In San José province the route covers Montes de Oca canton (San Pedro, Sabanilla, San Rafael districts).

References

Highways in Costa Rica